ʿAmr ibn Maymūn al-ʿAwdī was one of the Ansar  companions of the Islamic prophet Muhammad.

Works
He is quoted as a hadith narrator in Sunnan Abu Dawood.

See also
Islam

References

690s deaths
Tabi‘un Mukhadrimun
Tabi‘un hadith narrators